Francisco Herrera Jiménez (born 29 January 1965) is a Mexican politician from the Institutional Revolutionary Party. From 2009 to 2012 he served as Deputy of the LXI Legislature of the Mexican Congress representing Veracruz. He previously served as a local deputy in the Congress of Veracruz and as municipal president of Papantla.

References

1965 births
Living people
Politicians from Veracruz
Institutional Revolutionary Party politicians
21st-century Mexican politicians
Members of the Congress of Veracruz
Municipal presidents in Veracruz
People from Misantla
Deputies of the LXI Legislature of Mexico
Members of the Chamber of Deputies (Mexico) for Veracruz